Akoustic Band is the first album by the Chick Corea Akoustic Band, featuring Chick Corea with John Patitucci and Dave Weckl. The group was nominated and received the 1990 Grammy Award for Best Jazz Instrumental Performance, Group at the 32nd Annual Grammy Awards.

Reception 
AllMusic awarded the album with 1.5 stars and its review by Daniel Gioffre states: "After recording a string of fusion records in the late '80s with his Chick Corea Elektric Band, Chick Corea returned to acoustic jazz with this trio date. Enlisting Elektric Band sidemen John Patitucci and Dave Weckl, Corea swings through ten tracks with noticeably mixed results. The leader is as romantic as ever, playing with bravado even on ballads, flawlessly executing complicated ideas, reveling in drama and melodrama."

Track listing

Personnel 
Musicians
 Bass – John Patitucci
 Drums – Dave Weckl
 Piano, Producer – Chick Corea

Production
 Project Coordinator – Evelyn Brechtlein
 Engineer – Bernie Kirsh
 Executive Producer – Dave Grusin, Larry Rosen
 Executive Album Producer – Ron Moss
 Digital Mix Assistant – Larry Mah
 Recording Manager – Mick Thompson
 Recording Manager Assistant – Joseph Martin

Charts

Awards 
Grammy Awards

References 

1989 albums
Chick Corea albums
Grammy Award for Best Jazz Instrumental Album
GRP Records albums